Anakkara is a geographic area of around  that spans across Vandanmedu, Chakkupallam Panchayats in the Udumbanchola Taluk of Idukki District. Anakkara is the administrative capital of Chakkupallam Grama Panchayat and Anakkara Revenue Village. It is one of the 36 distinct places identified by Government of India and United Nations Development Programme for exploring and promoting the unique tourism potential (For Anakkara the spice plantations) of these places.

Demographics 
As of 2011 Census, Anakkara had a population of 24,193 with 12,056 males and 12,136 females. The average sex ratio was 1007 lower than the state average of 1084. In Anakkara, 9.8% of the population was under 6 years of age. Anakkara had an average literacy of 92% lower than the state average of 94%: male literacy was 94.2% and female literacy was 89.9%.

History

Ancient history, etymology

There are some indications of pre-historic life in Anakkara and its surroundings, but no comprehensive study has been done yet to give a more detailed anecdote here. Excavations in the past showed the presence of Nannangadis (cairns used by ancient civilizations) in many parts of Anakkara such as Pampupara, and Ambalamedu. Medieval Arabian coins were also reported to have been unearthed few years back from Kochera, a small hamlet near Anakkara.

It is generally believed that in the 12th century, Pandya king Manavikrama Kulashekhara Perumal who was defeated by Cholas moved eastwards to the area near the current Kerala-Tamil Nadu border on the Western Ghats and formed a small kingdom inclusive of Cumbum, Gudallur areas of the present Uthamapalayam Thaluk of Tamil Nadu. This is believed to be the origin of Poonjar dynasty. The nearby dense forests of Western Ghats(encompassing present day Anakkara) were bordering Manavikrama’s land. Manavikrama later moved further inside present day Kerala and settled on the banks of river Meenachil, with current Poonjar in Kottayam district of Kerala as his capital. Water scarcity was a big problem for the farmers of Cumbum and Gudallur in the planes below the Western Ghats while on top of the Ghats were dense rainforests with plenty of annual rainfall with many streams that gave water throughout the year. So the settlers of the planes constructed a Dam at a low-lying area(today known as Anakkara) of the Ghats to transport water down, primarily for irrigation. Thus the name Anakkara(meaning "The land/place of Dam"). Ana means Dam and Kara means Land/Place in Malayalam.

Till the mid-18th century, the forests of Anakkara and its surroundings were under Poonjar dynasty. In the second half of the 18th century, the maharajah of Travancore Marthandavarma conquered and merged Poonjar with Travancore. He has made agreements with The Cholas of Tamil Nadu and drawn the boundary between the two kingdoms. As a result of which Cumbum, Gudalur area of Tamil Nadu became part of Chola empire and the areas where the Dam(Ana) was situated – Anakkara - became part of Travancore. During the tenure of one of Marthandavarma's predecessors Vishakamtirunal, the dam was destroyed, yet the area where it was situated continued to be known as Anakkara.

The only inhabitants of the area before the beginning of the 20th century were a nomadic tribe named the Paliyas who traveled from place to place and did farming of food crops. There are a couple of small Paliya settlements in Anakkara and surroundings even today.

Modern history

In 1972 Kottayam district of Kerala was split into Kottayam and Idukki districts, as a part of which many of the revenue villages in both the districts were also split. In 1986, around 50 km2 area of Vandanmettu village was split into a new revenue village by the name Anakkara.

Most of the people are migrant farmers from nearby Kottayam district of Kerala who initially arrived in the first half of the 20th century for cultivation of food crops such as rice and later they started cultivating cash crops such as spices. However, the plantations (tea, cardamom etc.) in and around Anakkara are considered to be around 150 years old, and many of the earlier settlers during that time came as laborers in the plantations.

Religion

Various sections of Christianity, Hinduism and Muslims co-exist harmoniously. Among Christians, the followers of Syrian, Latin, Malankara Catholics, Orthodox church, Jacobite Syrian, Marthoma, St Thomas Evangelical Church of India, Church of South India, Pentecostal Churches(Assemblies of god,IPC, Saron,etc..., CSI, CMI and Believers Church form major Christian sects. Anakkara also has a moderate population of Jehovah's Witnesses.
The Hindu population consists of Ezhavas, Nairs and Dheevara Community and majority of the Thamil population too practise Hinduism.

Geography and climate 

Anakkara is situated on the State Highway 19 (which turns into National Highway at Poopara near Munnar) connecting Kumily and Munnar and is around 10–20 km from Thekkady and 60–80 km from Munnar. Anakkara is known for its greenery, fertile soil and good quality spices.

The boundaries of Anakkara are:
 East – Theni district of Tamil Nadu
 West – Chakkupallam village
 North – Vandanmedu village
 South – Kumily village

The soil of Anakkara and its surroundings are well known for its fertility. Temperature here varies between 15 - 25 degrees Celsius annually. The average annual rainfall is around 350 centimeters. The south-western monsoon (Known as Edavappathi in Malayalam; begins by the end of May or early June and goes on for about two months) and North-Eastern Monsoon (Called Thulavarsham in Malayalam, in the months of October and November and sometimes lasts till December) are the rainy seasons.

Main junctions in Anakkara are Anakkara 8th mile, Anakkara 7th mile, Anakkara 6th mile

Tourism, Places to Visit 

There are two factors that make Anakkara a tourist destination. One is its spice plantations, and the other the many picnic spots in and around Anakkara, suitable for tourists visiting the many prominent tourist destinations in the district such as Thekkady and Munnar

Distance from important places
 Thekkady Periyar Wildlife Sanctuary - 16 km
 Cochin International Airport - 170 km
 Kottayam Railway Station - 120 km
 Munnar - 90 km
 Vagamon - 50 km
 Madurai Airport - 150 km
 Kodaikanal - 100 km

Some of the attractions in and around Anakkara are

Chellarkovil (Notified Tourism Village by Govt.)

Beautiful land of Spices Situated at the peak of mount sahya (Western Ghats)this place offers a perfect view of the plains of Tamil Nadu from atop the hill. Though hitherto unexplored, the place is a good destination for high-altitude sports such as trekking and Paragliding. Terrain is full of rocks, hill slopes are dangerous to walk. Care must be taken while exploring the forest area. There is also a cave inside the Deep forest and no wild animals.

Aruvikuzhi Falls (Chellarcovil)

Chellarkovil is the ideal place for Spice sanctuaries, wellness centres, Ayuevedic destination resorts, adventure sport ventures and spice and echo tourism.

Ottakathalamedu

From here, tourists can get a panoramic view of the landscape of Anakkara and surrounding villages and also sunset.

Home stays

Due to the increased tourism promotion efforts by government and non-governmental agencies in the recent past, there are a number of Homestay facilities that have come up in and around Anakkara. Some of them are started by traditional farming families in the village and hence offer visits to their spice plantations as well for the tourists. There are also some hotels in the village that offer food and accommodation facilities.

Spice plantations

Anakkara is surrounded by many small and large scale cardamom and pepper plantations. Tourists can get a glimpse of farming, harvesting and processing of these spices by visiting the farms that offer plantation visits.
 
Tourists visiting Anakkara must also note that this is a remote village and may lack many of the infrastructures that they expect from a tourism center such as an Information Center, comfort stations, ATMs etc. Access is not a problem as Anakkara lies on the state highway connecting the state's two prominent tourist destinations of Thekkady and Munnar. There are a lot of taxis, auto-rikshaws available in the village. Long distance bus services are available to Bangalore, Kochi etc.

Health tourism

Ayurvedic therapy centers are also coming up in Anakkara. at Anakkara is a leading Ayurvedic treatment center that attracts people from all over the world.

Economy 

From the early 20th century, Anakkara and its surroundings are home for a variety of agricultural crops such as cardamom, pepper, coffee, paddy and of late vanilla and other spices. About 80% of the population of Anakkara are farmers. Among them 60% are small-time farmers with less than 2 hectares of land. About 15% are limited-farmers with less than 1 acre of land. Most of these two classes of farmers also have dairy farming as their primary/secondary income. Around 10000 litres of milk goes from the village to the dairy milk chilling plants every day. The remaining 20% of farmers are either cardamom planters with 2 -  of land or farmers who take plantations on lease.
Cash crops such as Cardamom, Pepper, Ginger, Vanilla, Coffee, Tea, food crops such as rice, vegetables, and tapioca are cultivated in the farmlands of Anakkara. Remaining 20% of the population are laborers in plantations and small farms and government, public sector employees.

Annual per capita income is around 37000 INR. Most of the income comes from agriculture out of which mainly cardamom and pepper and dairy farming.

Banks, financial institutions

 State Bank of Travancore, Anakkara
 Union Bank of India, Anakkara
 Federal Bank, Puttady
 Service Cooperative Bank, Kochera
 Service Cooperative Bank, Anakkara
 Agriculture development Bank, Puttady
 District co-operative Bank, Anakkara

ATM facility
Union Bank of India, Anakkara
State Bank of Travencore, Anakkara

There are about 20 small and big private financial institutions have branches in the village. Non-profit organizations such as Anakkara Vikasana Sangam operate in the village, with the purpose of building self-reliant village communities through various community programs.

Fruits of the land 

Most of the areas in the village are well connected through roads. Freshwater availability in Anakkara is above state average.

Other important government/administrative offices at Anakkara

 Chakkupallam Panchayat Office,
 Chakkupallam Village Office
 Anakkara Village office,
 Post Offices – Anakkara, Pampupara, Puttady, Chellarkoil, Kochera.
 Agriculture Office, Vandanmettu
 Police Station, Vandanmettu
 Police Station, Kumily

Education and health care 
Till the mid-1990s, the only educational institution in the village were the State Government High Schools at Anakkara and Puttady. In 1994, Montfort Bros. of St. Gabriel, a Catholic congregation started Montfort School, Anakkara, now a leading English medium school in the district. The main educational institutions/higher education centers here are
 Holycross Engineering College, Puttady
 Montfort School, Anakkara
 Government Higher Secondary School, Anakkara
 Government Higher Secondary School, Puttady
 AKJM Upper Primary School, Kochera
 Lower Primary School, Puttady
 St. George Lower Primary School, Kochera
 NSS Lower Primary School, Chellarkovil
 I.M.S.L.P.S., Anakkara
 Government homeopathic hospital 
 Primary Health Centre 
 Govt. Veterinary Hospital 
 NSPHS, Puttady

A hospital run by the nuns of Franciscan Clarist Congregation named Alphonsa Health Center and many other privately run clinics. H.P Petrol Pump

Public libraries
 Panchayat Library, Anakkra
 Njanodayam Public Library, Chellarcovil

People, religions 

The majority of Anakkara’s population are descendants of farmers migrated from the plains of the state such as neighboring Kottayam and Eranakulam district in the first half of the 20th century. There are about 300 people (80 families) who are from the Paliya tribe, as well as a fairly large Tamil-speaking population who are either migrants or descendants of migrants who came as laborers in the spice plantations in the area from the neighboring Madurai and Theni districts of Tamil Nadu.

People from all the three main religions in India – Hindus, Muslims and Christians – constitute the population of Anakkara. There are about 25+ Christian churches and prayer halls, 10+ Hindu temples and one Mosque in the village

Prominent religious places in the village are

St. Thomas Forane Catholic church Anakkara
 Marian Retreat Centre, Anakkara
India Pentecostal Church of God, Anakkara
 Church of God in India, Anakkara
 Assemblies of God church, Chellarcoil road, Anakkara
 St. Thomas Evangelical Church of India, 7th Mile- Anakkara
 Mar Gregoriouse Carmel Kurisumala Pilgrim Centre Puttady (St. Mary's Orthodox Church)
 St. Thomas Jacobite Syrian Orthodox Church, 7th Mile, Anakkara
 Kadassikadavu Mosque
 Siva Parvathi Hindu temple Anakkara
 Chakkulathamma Hindu temple Sulthankada
 Chittampara vinayagar temple, Sulthankada
 Sree Narayana Dharma Paripalana Yogam Bhajana Madom, 7th Mile Anakkara
 Mariamman Hindu Temple, Pampupara

There are a large number of Christian (Protestant/non-Protestant) congregations such as the Pentecostal churches, Malankara Mar Thoma Syrian Church which run their churches and prayer halls in the village.

References 
Anakkara bus station

Villages in Idukki district